MorphOS is an AmigaOS-like computer operating system (OS). It is a mixed proprietary and open source OS produced for the Pegasos PowerPC (PPC) processor based computer, PowerUP accelerator equipped Amiga computers, and a series of Freescale development boards that use the Genesi firmware, including the Efika and mobileGT. Since MorphOS 2.4, Apple's Mac mini G4 is supported as well, and with the release of MorphOS 2.5 and MorphOS 2.6 the eMac and Power Mac G4 models are respectively supported. The release of MorphOS 3.2 added limited support for Power Mac G5. The core, based on the Quark microkernel, is proprietary, although several libraries and other parts are open source, such as the Ambient desktop.

Characteristics and versions
Developed for PowerPC central processing units (CPUs) from Freescale and IBM it also supports the original AmigaOS Motorola 68000 series (68k, MC680x0) applications via proprietary task-based emulation, and most AmigaOS PPC applications via API wrappers. It is application programming interface (API) compatible with AmigaOS 3.1 and has a graphical user interface (GUI) based on Magic User Interface (MUI).

Besides the Pegasos version of MorphOS, there is a version for Amiga computers equipped with PowerUP accelerator cards produced by Phase5. This version is free, as is registration. If unregistered, it slows down after each two-hour session. PowerUP MorphOS was most recently updated on 23 February 2006; however, it does not exceed the feature set or advancement of the Pegasos release.

A version of MorphOS for the Efika, a very small mainboard based on the ultra-low-power MPC5200B processor from Freescale, has been shown at exhibitions and user gatherings in Germany. Current (since 2.0) release of MorphOS supports the Efika.

Components

ABox
ABox is an emulation sandbox featuring a PPC native AmigaOS API clone that is binary compatible with both 68k Amiga applications and both PowerUP and WarpOS formats of Amiga PPC executables. ABox is based in part on AROS Research Operating System. ABox includes Trance JIT code translator for 68k native Amiga applications.

Other
 AHI – audio interface: 6.7
 Ambient – the default MorphOS desktop, inspired by Workbench and Directory Opus 5
 CyberGraphX – graphics interface originally developed for Amiga computers: 5.1
 Magic User Interface – primary graphical user interface (GUI) toolkit: 4.2
 Poseidon – the Amiga USB stack developed by Chris Hodges
 TurboPrint – the printing system
 TinyGL – OpenGL implementation and Warp3D compatibility is featured via Rendering Acceleration Virtual Engine (RAVE) low-level API: V 51
 Quark – manages the low level systems and hosts the A/Box currently

MorphOS software
MorphOS can run any system friendly Amiga software written for 68k processors. Also it is possible to use 68k libraries or datatypes on PPC applications and vice versa. It also provides compatibility layer for PowerUP and WarpUP software written for PowerUP accelerator cards. The largest repository is Aminet with over 75,000 packages online with packages from all Amiga flavors including music, sound, and artwork. MorphOS-only software repositories are hosted at MorphOS software, MorphOS files and MorphOS Storage.

Bundled applications

MorphOS is delivered with several desktop applications in the form of pre-installed software.

Supported hardware
 Max. 1.72 GB RAM; virtual memory is not supported.
 Only Radeon cards have support; Nvidia cards are not supported.

Amiga
 Amiga 1200 with Blizzard PPC accelerator card
 Amiga 3000 with CyberStorm PPC accelerator card
 Amiga 4000 with CyberStorm PPC accelerator card

Apple
 Mac mini G4
 eMac
 Power Mac G4
 PowerBook G4 (except for 12" aluminum models)
 iBook G4
 Power Mac G5
 Power Mac G4 Cube
 iMac G5 (only model A1145 – G5 2.1 20" (iSight))

Genesi/bPlan GmbH
 Efika 5200B
 Pegasos I G3, II G3/G4

ACube
 ACube Systems Srl company and their Sam460 series mainboards

A-Eon Technology
 AmigaOne X5000 mainboard

History

The project began in 1999, based on the Quark microkernel. The earliest versions of MorphOS ran only via PPC accelerator cards on the Amiga computers, and required portions of AmigaOS to fully function. A collaborative effort between the companies bPlan (of which the lead MorphOS developer is a partner) and Thendic-France in 2002 resulted in the first regular, non-prototype production of bPlan-engineered Pegasos computers capable of running MorphOS or Linux. Thendic-France had financial problems and folded; however, the collaboration continued under the new banner of "Genesi". A busy promotional year followed in 2003, with appearances at conventions and exhibitions in several places around the world, including the Consumer Electronics Show (CES) in Las Vegas.

After some bitter disagreements within the MorphOS development team in 2003 and 2004, culminating with accusations by a MorphOS developer that he and others had not been paid, the Ambient desktop interface was released under GPL and is now actively developed by the Ambient development team. Subject to GPL rules, Ambient continues to be included in the commercial MorphOS product. An alternative MorphOS desktop system is Scalos.

On April 1, 2008, the MorphOS team announced that MorphOS 2.0 would be released within Q2/2008. This promise was only kept by a few seconds, with the release of MorphOS 2.0 occurring on June 30, 2008 23:59 CET. MorphOS 3.11 is commercially available at a price of €79 per machine (€49 for the Efika PPC or Sam460 boards). A fully functional demo of MorphOS is available, but without a keyfile, its speed is decreased significantly after 30 minutes of use per session; rebooting the system allows for another 30 minutes of use.

Release history of 0.x/1.x series

Release history of 2.x/3.x series

MorphOS 2 includes a native TCP/IP stack ("Netstack") and a Web browser, Sputnik or Origyn Web Browser. Sputnik was begun under a user community bounty system that also resulted in MOSNet, a free, separate TCP/IP stack for MorphOS 1 users. Sputnik is a port of the KHTML rendering engine, on which WebKit is also based. Sputnik is no longer being developed and was removed from later MorphOS 2 releases.

See also

 Ambient (desktop environment)
 Amiga
 APUS (computer)
 AROS Research Operating System (AROS)
 Magic User Interface (MUI)

References

External links

Aminet Amiga/MorphOS software repository
MorphZone, Supported Computers
MorphOS Software Database
MorphOS software repository
MorphOS: The Lightning OS
Obligement – Magazine about AmigaOS and MorphOS
www.warmup-asso.org – Portal dedicated to MorphOS users
MorphOS Storage – MorphOS Software Storage

 
2000 software
Amiga software
MorphOS software
Operating system distributions bootable from read-only media
PowerPC operating systems
Microkernel-based operating systems
Microkernels